The South African type X-17 water tender was a Garratt steam locomotive tender.

Type X-17 water tenders first entered service in 1938, as auxiliary water tenders to the Class GM  Double Mountain type Garratt steam locomotives which entered service on the South African Railways in that year.

Manufacturers
The first Type X-17 water tenders were built by the South African Railways (SAR) in its Pietermaritzburg shops in 1938. A redesigned second version was built in 1953.

During 1938 and 1939, the SAR placed sixteen Class GM Garratt articulated steam locomotives with a 4-8-2+2-8-4 Double Mountain type wheel arrangement in goods train service on the Mafeking line out of Johannesburg. The locomotives were built by Beyer, Peacock & Company. The initial designs of the Class GM Garratt by W.A.J. Day, Chief Mechanical Engineer of the SAR from 1936 to 1939, were rejected by the Chief Civil Engineer, since the weight on the leading and trailing bogies of each engine unit would exceed the acceptable limit for the  rail of the Mafeking line. The meagre water supply, which would really only be sufficient for shunting purposes, would be augmented by semi-permanently coupling a purpose-built auxiliary water tender to the locomotive.

The Type X-17 water tender first entered service as tenders to these locomotives. In effect, since Garratt locomotives had hitherto been considered as tank engines because they carry all their water on board, this arrangement introduced the tank-and-tender Garratt. In spite of initial criticisms and doubts, the unusual arrangement of auxiliary water tenders which had earlier only been seen on the Kitson-Meyer locomotives of the Cape Government Railways and Central South African Railways of 1903 and 1904 respectively, proved to be very effective and was later repeated upon the introduction of the Classes GMA and GO Garratts in 1954.

Characteristics

Photographs from the 1940s show the original water tenders with a traditional high turret.

A second version of the Type X-17 water tender was built in 1953, for use with the first 25 Class GMA and the 25 Class GO Garratt locomotives which were to enter service the following year. These water tenders had a low flat-topped turret with a hinged hatch and a curved handrail across the tank barrel, similar to that of the Type MX tender. It rode on SARCAST bogies (similar to North American Bettendorf trucks) with coil springs.

Locomotives
Three Garratt locomotive classes were designed as tank-and-tender Garratts and rarely worked without auxiliary water tenders. The Type X-17 water tenders were originally numbered for these engines in the number ranges as shown.
 1938: Class GM, numbers 2291 to 2306.
 1954: Class GMA, first batch, numbers 4051 to 4075.
 1954: Class GO, numbers 2572 to 2596.

When the SAR adopted a computerised goods wagon numbering system, the surviving Type X-17 water tenders were allocated numbers in the range from 30 019 052 to 30 019 125 (short numbers 1905 to 1912) in respect of the 1938 models and in the number range from 30 019 214 to 30 019 672 (short numbers 1921 to 1967) in respect of the 1953 models. Water tenders bearing "X-17" markings have, however, been photographed bearing numbers in the 30 025 xxx number range of the Type X-20 water tenders.

Preservation
After the end of steam operations in the late 1980s, most of the watering facilities which once existed country-wide have either fallen into disuse or been removed. The Pretoria-based steam heritage club Friends of the Rail and the Germiston-based Reefsteamers therefore often operate their preserved Class 15F steam locomotives with preserved auxiliary water tenders to extend their water range.

Illustration

References

X-17